Guapacha may refer to one of the following

Guapachá, a style of Cuban music, a variant of guaracha
Amado Borcelá (1934–1966), Cuban singer known as "Guapachá"
Guapacha timing, timing in cha-cha-cha steps
Guapacha (dance), modern fusion of hip-hop and cha-cha-cha